Jamno  is a village in the administrative district of Gmina Przewóz, within Żary County, Lubusz Voivodeship, in western Poland, close to the German border.

References

Villages in Żary County